The Girl at the Inn (Spanish: La niña de la venta) is a 1951 Spanish musical comedy film directed by Ramón Torrado and starring Lola Flores, Manolo Caracol and Manuel Requena. In Cadiz a small cabaret is used as a cover for smuggling.

The film's art direction was by Enrique Alarcón. The film was shot in the Sancti Petri fishing village and harbour in Chiclana de la Frontera.

Plot

Cast

 Lola Flores as Reyes  
 Manolo Caracol as Don Rafael  
 Manuel Requena as Charanguito 
 Rubén Rojo as Juan Luis / Carlos de Osuna  
 Xan das Bolas as Dimas  
 Erika Morgan as Rachel  
 José Nieto as Captain 'Tiburon'  
 Raúl Cancio as Sargento Guardia Civil 
 Manuel Morao as Guitarist  
 Carmen Flores as Gypsy  
 Concha López Silva as Fortune Teller 
 Francisco Aguilera 
 José Arroyo
 Félix Briones 
 Luis Domínguez Luna 
 Manuel Ortega
 Rafael Ortega
 Ángel Sevillano

References

Bibliography 
 Bentley, Bernard. A Companion to Spanish Cinema. Boydell & Brewer 2008.

External links 
 

1951 musical comedy films
Spanish musical comedy films
1951 films
1950s Spanish-language films
Films directed by Ramón Torrado
Films set in Andalusia
1950s Spanish films